Moths of Mauritania represent about 165 known moth species. The moths (mostly nocturnal) and butterflies (mostly diurnal) together make up the taxonomic order Lepidoptera.

This is a list of moth species which have been recorded in Mauritania.

Arctiidae
Utetheisa pulchella (Linnaeus, 1758)

Cossidae
Nomima prophanes Durrant, 1916

Crambidae
Filodes costivitralis Guenée, 1862

Lasiocampidae
Braura othello Zolotuhin & Gurkovich, 2009
Odontocheilopteryx ferlina Gurkovich & Zolotuhin, 2009

Noctuidae
Abrostola confusa Dufay, 1958
Acantholipes circumdata (Walker, 1858)
Achaea catella Guenée, 1852
Achaea lienardi (Boisduval, 1833)
Acontia biskrensis Oberthür, 1887
Acontia imitatrix Wallengren, 1856
Acontia insocia (Walker, 1857)
Acontia nigrimacula Hacker, Legrain & Fibiger, 2008
Acontia opalinoides Guenée, 1852
Acontia wahlbergi Wallengren, 1856
Adisura callima Bethune-Baker, 1911
Aegocera rectilinea Boisduval, 1836
Agrotis biconica Kollar, 1844
Agrotis herzogi Rebel, 1911
Agrotis ipsilon (Hufnagel, 1766)
Agrotis sardzeana Brandt, 1941
Agrotis segetum ([Denis & Schiffermüller], 1775)
Agrotis trux (Hübner, 1824)
Amyna axis Guenée, 1852
Amyna delicata Wiltshire, 1994
Anarta trifolii (Hufnagel, 1766)
Androlymnia clavata Hampson, 1910
Antarchaea conicephala (Staudinger, 1870)
Anumeta spilota (Erschoff, 1874)
Argyrogramma signata (Fabricius, 1775)
Aspidifrontia berioi Hacker & Hausmann, 2010
Aspidifrontia hemileuca (Hampson, 1909)
Aspidifrontia pallidula Hacker & Hausmann, 2010
Aspidifrontia villiersi (Laporte, 1972)
Asplenia melanodonta (Hampson, 1896)
Attatha metaleuca Hampson, 1913
Audea kathrina Kühne, 2005
Audea melaleuca Walker, 1865
Audea paulumnodosa Kühne, 2005
Autoba teilhardi (de Joannis, 1909)
Brevipecten confluens Hampson, 1926
Brithys crini (Fabricius, 1775)
Calliodes pretiosissima Holland, 1892
Calophasia platyptera (Esper, [1788])
Cardepia affinis Rothschild, 1913
Cardepia sociabilis de Graslin, 1850
Cerocala albicornis Berio, 1966
Cerocala caelata Karsch, 1896
Chalciope pusilla (Holland, 1894)
Chasmina vestae (Guenée, 1852)
Chrysodeixis acuta (Walker, [1858])
Chrysodeixis chalcites (Esper, 1789)
Clytie infrequens (Swinhoe, 1884)
Clytie sancta (Staudinger, 1900)
Clytie tropicalis Rungs, 1975
Condica capensis (Guenée, 1852)
Condica conducta (Walker, 1857)
Condica viscosa (Freyer, 1831)
Crypsotidia maculifera (Staudinger, 1898)
Crypsotidia remanei Wiltshire, 1977
Cyligramma fluctuosa (Drury, 1773)
Cyligramma magus (Guérin-Méneville, [1844])
Diparopsis watersi (Rothschild, 1901)
Drasteria kabylaria (Bang-Haas, 1906)
Dysgonia torrida (Guenée, 1852)
Eublemma baccalix (Swinhoe, 1886)
Eublemma ecthaemata Hampson, 1896
Eublemma gayneri (Rothschild, 1901)
Eublemma parva (Hübner, [1808])
Eublemma ragusana (Freyer, 1844)
Eublemma robertsi Berio, 1969
Eublemma scitula (Rambur, 1833)
Eublemma tytrocoides Hacker & Hausmann, 2010
Eublemmoides apicimacula (Mabille, 1880)
Eutelia polychorda Hampson, 1902
Gesonia obeditalis Walker, 1859
Gnamptonyx innexa (Walker, 1858)
Grammodes congenita Walker, 1858
Grammodes stolida (Fabricius, 1775)
Haplocestra similis Aurivillius, 1910
Helicoverpa armigera (Hübner, [1808])
Helicoverpa assulta (Guenée, 1852)
Heliocheilus confertissima (Walker, 1865)
Heliothis nubigera Herrich-Schäffer, 1851
Heliothis peltigera ([Denis & Schiffermüller], 1775)
Heteropalpia acrosticta (Püngeler, 1904)
Heteropalpia exarata (Mabille, 1890)
Hypena laceratalis Walker, 1859
Hypena lividalis (Hübner, 1790)
Hypena obacerralis Walker, [1859]
Hypocala rostrata (Fabricius, 1794)
Hypotacha ochribasalis (Hampson, 1896)
Iambia jansei Berio, 1966
Leoniloma convergens Hampson, 1926
Leucania loreyi (Duponchel, 1827)
Marathyssa cuneata (Saalmüller, 1891)
Masalia albiseriata (Druce, 1903)
Masalia bimaculata (Moore, 1888)
Masalia nubila (Hampson, 1903)
Masalia rubristria (Hampson, 1903)
Maxera nigriceps (Walker, 1858)
Melanephia nigrescens (Wallengren, 1856)
Metachrostis quinaria (Moore, 1881)
Metopoceras kneuckeri (Rebel, 1903)
Mitrophrys magna (Walker, 1854)
Mythimna languida (Walker, 1858)
Mythimna umbrigera (Saalmüller, 1891)
Ophiusa mejanesi (Guenée, 1852)
Ophiusa tirhaca (Cramer, 1777)
Oraesia intrusa (Krüger, 1939)
Ozarba rubrivena Hampson, 1910
Ozarba subtilimba Berio, 1963
Ozarba variabilis Berio, 1940
Pandesma muricolor Berio, 1966
Pandesma robusta (Walker, 1858)
Parachalciope benitensis (Holland, 1894)
Pericyma mendax (Walker, 1858)
Pericyma metaleuca Hampson, 1913
Plecopterodes moderata (Wallengren, 1860)
Polydesma umbricola Boisduval, 1833
Polytela cliens (Felder & Rogenhofer, 1874)
Polytelodes florifera (Walker, 1858)
Prionofrontia ochrosia Hampson, 1926
Pseudozarba bipartita (Herrich-Schäffer, 1950)
Rhabdophera arefacta (Swinhoe, 1884)
Rhabdophera clathrum (Guenée, 1852)
Rhabdophera hansali (Felder & Rogenhofer, 1874)
Rhynchina leucodonta Hampson, 1910
Sesamia nonagrioides (Lefèbvre, 1827)
Sphingomorpha chlorea (Cramer, 1777)
Spodoptera cilium Guenée, 1852
Spodoptera exempta (Walker, 1857)
Spodoptera exigua (Hübner, 1808)
Spodoptera littoralis (Boisduval, 1833)
Tachosa fumata (Wallengren, 1860)
Tathorhynchus exsiccata (Lederer, 1855)
Thiacidas meii Hacker & Zilli, 2007
Trichoplusia ni (Hübner, [1803])
Trichoplusia orichalcea (Fabricius, 1775)
Tytroca leucoptera (Hampson, 1896)
Ulotrichopus primulina (Hampson, 1902)
Ulotrichopus tinctipennis (Hampson, 1902)

Nolidae
Arcyophora patricula (Hampson, 1902)
Bryophilopsis tarachoides Mabille, 1900
Earias biplaga Walker, 1866
Earias insulana (Boisduval, 1833)
Leocyma appollinis Guenée, 1852
Meganola reubeni Agassiz, 2009
Neaxestis mesogonia (Hampson, 1905)
Negeta luminosa (Walker, 1858)
Negeta purpurascens Hampson, 1912
Odontestis striata Hampson, 1912
Pardoxia graellsii (Feisthamel, 1837)
Xanthodes albago (Fabricius, 1794)
Xanthodes brunnescens (Pinhey, 1968)

Pterophoridae
Agdistis tamaricis (Zeller, 1847)

Pyralidae
Hypotia numidalis Hampson, 1900)

Tineidae
Anomalotinea cubiculella (Staudinger, 1859)
Ceratophaga infuscatella (de Joannis, 1897)
Infurcitinea marcunella (Rebel, 1901)
Myrmecozela lambessella Rebel, 1901
Perissomastix agenjoi (Petersen, 1957)
Perissomastix biskraella (Rebel, 1901)
Rhodobates algiricella (Rebel, 1901)
Trichophaga bipartitella (Ragonot, 1892)

Tortricidae
Epinotia hesperidana Kennel, 1921

References

External links 
AfroMoths

Maur
Moths
Mauritania
Mauritania